Sreeram is a 2002 Indian Telugu-language action masala film starring Uday Kiran, Anita Hassanandani and Ashish Vidyarthi. This film was directed by V. N. Aditya and produced by Burugapally Siva Rama Krishna. Music was scored by R. P. Patnaik. It is a remake of the  Tamil film, Dhill, which starred Vikram, Laila Mehdin, Nassar and Vivek in critical roles. The film was an average grosser at the box office.

The film was later dubbed into Hindi as Ghera Ghaav by Goldmines Telefilms.

Plot
Sriram (Uday Kiran) wants to become a cop. Madhu (Anitha) is the sister of Sriram's brother-in-law. C.I. "Encounter" Shankar misbehaves with Madhu which causes a fight between Sriram and Shankar. Shankar decides to take revenge on Sriram by filing a false report during police verification about S.I selections and also kills Sriram's dearest friend. Finally Sriram fights with him and kills him.

Cast

 Uday Kiran as Sreeram Kumar
 Anita Hassanandani as Madhu
 Ashish Vidyarthi as C.I. "Encounter" Shankar
 Siva Krishna as Police Officer Narayana
 Sunil as Bose
 Sudha as Sreeram's mother
 Paruchuri Venkateswara Rao as Sreeram's father
 Deepa Venkat as Kamala, Sreeram's sister
 Tanikella Bharani as Minister Subba Rayudu
 Dharmavarapu Subramanyam as Constable Shiva
 Narsing Yadav as Das, Subba Rayudu's henchman
 Kaushal Manda as Sreeram's friend
 Lakshmipathi as Lakshmipathi
 Kadambari Kiran as Politician
 M. S. Narayana
 Devadas Kanakala
 Kiran Rathod in a special appearance in the song Pedavullo Pepsicola

Soundtrack
Music was composed by R. P. Patnaik. Chandrabose and Kulasekhar wrote 2 songs each, Kulasekhar wrote one more song in collaboration with R. P. Patnaik. Sirivennela Seetharama Sastry wrote one song. Music was released by Aditya Music company.

Reception 
Gudipoodi Srihari of The Hindu wrote that "The film can be summed up in two words: Violence Unlimited".

References

External links 
 

2002 films
2000s Telugu-language films
Telugu remakes of Tamil films
Films directed by V. N. Aditya